The Vozha is a river in Ryazan Oblast, Russia. It is a right tributary of the Oka.

The town of Rybnoye is situated by the Vozha.

In August 1378, Muscovite prince Dmitry Donskoy defeated a Mongol army in the Battle of the Vozha River.

References 

Rivers of Ryazan Oblast